Leven Beach Conservation Park is a protected area in the Australian state of South Australia, located on the north coast of the lower part of Yorke Peninsula within the boundaries of the gazetted localities of Point Souttar and The Pines about  west north-west of Point Turton.

The conservation park was proclaimed in 1988 for the purpose of conserving ‘sheoak woodland and potentially provides habitat for a nationally endangered species of butterfly, the Yellowish Sedge-skipper Butterfly’.

The conservation park is classified as an IUCN Category III protected area.

References

External links
Leven Beach Conservation Park webpage on protected planet

Conservation parks of South Australia
Protected areas established in 1988
Spencer Gulf
Yorke Peninsula